GENUKI is a genealogy web portal, run as a charitable trust.  It "provides a virtual reference library of genealogical information of particular relevance to the UK and Ireland". It gives access to a large collection of information, with the emphasis on primary sources, or means to access them, rather than on existing genealogical research.

Name
The name derives from "GENealogy of the UK and Ireland", although its coverage is wider than this. From the GENUKI website:

Structure
The website has a well defined structure at four levels.
 The first level is information that is common to all "the United Kingdom and Ireland".
 The next level has information for each of England (see example) Ireland, Scotland, Wales, the Channel Islands and the Isle of Man.
 The third level has information on each pre-1974 county of England and Wales, each of the pre-1975 counties of Scotland, each of the 32 counties of Ireland and each island of the Channel Islands (e.g. Cheshire, County Kerry and Guernsey).
 The fourth level has information on each town or parish (e.g. Antrobus, Cheshire).

The structure is shown diagrammatically in the "Contents and Site Map".

Subject headings
At each level, some of the subject headings from the list prepared by the Family History Library in Salt Lake City are used.  The full list is:

 Almanacs
 Archives and Libraries
 Bibliography
 Biography
 Business and Commerce Records
 Cemeteries
 Censuses
 Chronology
 Church Directories
 Church History
 Church Records
 Civil Registration
 Colonization
 Correctional Institutions
 Court Records
 Description and Travel
 Directories
 
 Dwellings
 Emigration and Immigration
 Encyclopedias
 Ethnology
 Folklore
 Gazetteers
 Genealogy
 Guardianship
 Handwriting
 Heraldry
 Historical Geography
 History
 Inventories
 Jewish History
 Jewish Records
 Land and Property
 Languages

 Law and Legislation
 Manors
 Maps
 Medical Records
 Merchant Marine
 Migration, Internal
 Military History
 Military Records
 Minorities
 Names, Geographical
 Names, Personal
 Naturalisation and Citizenship
 Newspapers
 Nobility
 Obituaries
 Occupations
 Officials and Employees
 Orphans and Orphanages

 Pensions
 Periodicals
 Politics and Government
 Poorhouses, Poor Law etc.
 Population
 Postal and Shipping Guides
 Probate Records
 Public Records
 Religion and Religious Life
 Schools
 Social Life and Customs
 Societies
 Statistics
 Taxation
 Town Records
 Visitations, Heraldic
 Voting Registers
 Yearbooks

Contents
In some instances GENUKI pages include actual information, but more often they provide links to sources of information, either as online links or by providing information about hard copy publications or repositories. For many locations, a description is quoted from an old (and therefore out-of-copyright) gazetteer. As GENUKI is maintained solely by volunteers, the level of detail varies in different parts of the site. Material on the GENUKI website is copyright, and also protected by UK database right, and it must only be used for personal research and not copied onto other websites.

References

External links
 
 GENUKI at thegoodwebguide.co.uk website

British genealogy websites
Historiography of the United Kingdom
Historiography of Ireland
Information technology organisations based in the United Kingdom